WRXA-LP is a Variety formatted broadcast radio station. The station is licensed to and serving Rocky Mount in Virginia. WRXA-LP is owned and operated by Rocky Mount Community Radio.

References

External links
 

2017 establishments in Virginia
Variety radio stations in the United States
RXA-LP
RXA-LP